Gary Beadle (born 22 March 1988) is an English reality television personality from Prudhoe, Northumberland known primarily for appearing in the MTV reality series Geordie Shore from 2011 to 2017. In 2015, he appeared in the second series of Ex on the Beach, and later returned to take part in the All Stars fifth series in 2016. In 2019, Beadle began starring in the MTV series Geordie OGs, a spinoff series of Geordie Shore.

Career
Gary Beadle first became known for being an original cast member of Geordie Shore in 2011. From December 2015 to April 2016, Beadle and Charlotte Crosby started a romantic relationship outside of filming Geordie Shore. This came to an end following Crosby's miscarriage of the pair's first child through an ectopic pregnancy, 
He last appeared in 2017 after announcing that he was to become a father. In 2014, Beadle appeared in the second series of Ex on the Beach with Tommy A Starz as the former flame of Melissa Reeves. He was later joined by fellow Geordie Shore cast member Charlotte Crosby and Emily Coller. In 2016, Beadle returned to Ex on the Beach for a second time during the fifth series, this time as main cast. Lillie Lexie Gregg and Melissa Reeves joined the series as his exes. It was also announced that Beadle would be taking part in the new MTV show Spring Break With Grandad which sees eight twenty somethings head to Cancun with their grandparents for spring break.

Beadle has also made guest appearances in TV programmes such as Drunk History, Safeword, Big Brother's Bit on the Side, Celebrity Wedding Planner, and Britain's Got More Talent. In 2015, Beadle performed with the male stripping troupe Dreamboys doing guest appearances alongside fellow Geordie Shore cast member Scotty T.

In 2017, Beadle appeared as a celebrity contestant on the Australian version of Hell's Kitchen. He revealed that his chosen charity is Australian Wounded Heroes as he was in the Royal Marines at 16 in Britain.

Filmography

Guest appearances
Big Brother's Bit on the Side (10 July 2012)
Celebrity Wedding Planner (18 October 2013)
Drunk History (23 February 2016)
Britain's Got More Talent (28 May 2016)
Safeword (9 June 2016)
This Morning (1 September 2016)

References

1988 births
Living people
Geordie Shore
Place of birth missing (living people)
People from Hexham